A.S.D. Due Torri is a soccer club based in Piraino, Sicily, Italy. It currently plays in Italy in Promozione.

History

Founding
The club was founded in 1973.

Serie D 
During the 201213 season, the team was promoted for the first time, from  Eccellenza Sicilia / B to Serie D, to fill vacant positions that had been created.

The club was expelled from the Italian Football Federation in January 2017 after failing to show up for four consecutive games in the 2016–17 Serie D.

A phoenix club was successively formed and admitted to the amateur regional Prima Categoria league.

Colors 
The team's color is red.

References

1973 establishments in Italy